Élie de Poliakoff was a Russian-Jewish aristocrat and equestrian, who was regarded "among the best sportsmen in Paris". He competed in the long jump, hacks and hunter and four-in-hand events at the 1900 Summer Olympics.

Poliakoff was born in Kharkiv, Russian Empire, in 1870. He had at least five brothers and two sisters. Élie de Poljakow was the son of banker Lazar Polyakov. He lived in Paris and died in 1942.

References

External links

1870 births
1942 deaths
Sportspeople from Kharkiv
Sportspeople from Paris
Jewish sportspeople
Russian male equestrians
Olympic equestrians of Russia
Equestrians at the 1900 Summer Olympics